Ahmad Walid Taktouk (born 29 September 1984) is a Lebanese footballer who plays as a goalkeeper for  club Sagesse.

Club career 
Taktouk started his career at Akhaa Ahli Aley, before moving to Nejmeh in 2014. After playing as the first goalkeeper for three years, he moved to Bekaa on loan in 2017, before joining Safa the following year.

After having returned Nejmeh in 2019, Taktouk was sent on a one-year loan to Shabab Bourj on 21 August 2021. He joined Sagesse in August 2022 on a free transfer.

International career 
Taktouk made his international debut on 19 February 2014, in a 3–1 home win against Pakistan. In December 2018, he was called up for the 2019 AFC Asian Cup squad.

Honours 
Nejmeh
 Lebanese Elite Cup: 2021
 Lebanese FA Cup runner-up: 2020–21
 Lebanese Super Cup runner-up: 2021

References

External links

 
 
 
 
 

1984 births
Living people
Footballers from Beirut
Lebanese footballers
Association football goalkeepers
Akhaa Ahli Aley FC players
Nejmeh SC players
Bekaa SC players
Safa SC players
Shabab El Bourj SC players
Sagesse SC footballers
Lebanese Premier League players
Lebanon international footballers
2019 AFC Asian Cup players